Dismorphia lua is a butterfly in the  family Pieridae. It is found from Costa Rica to Ecuador, Bolivia, Colombia and Peru.

Subspecies
The following subspecies are recognised:
Dismorphia lua lua (Ecuador)
Dismorphia lua garleppi Staudinger, 1894 (Bolivia)
Dismorphia lua idae Fassl, 1910 (Colombia)
Dismorphia lua costaricensis (Schaus, 1913) (Costa Rica)
Dismorphia lua roberta Lamas, 2004 (Peru)

References

Dismorphiinae
Butterflies described in 1869
Pieridae of South America
Taxa named by William Chapman Hewitson